The 2021 Waterford Senior Hurling Championship was the 121st staging of the Waterford Senior Hurling Championship since its establishment by the Waterford County Board in 1897. The championship began on 28 August 2021 and ended on 3 October 2021.

Ballygunner were the defending champions. Ballyduff Upper and Ballysaggart were relegated from the championship after being beaten in a series of playoffs.

The final was played on 3 October 2021 at Walsh Park in Waterford, between Ballygunner and Roanmore, in what was their first ever meeting in a final. Ballygunner won the match by 2-27 to 0-13 to claim their 20th championship title overall and an eighth consecutive title.

Lismore's Maurice Shanahan was the championship's top scorer with 7-43.

Team changes

To Championship

Promoted from the Waterford Intermediate Hurling Championship
 Ballyduff Upper

Results

Group A

Group A table

Group A results

Group B

Group B table

Group B results

Group C

Group C table

Group C results

Group D

Group D table

Group D results

Knockout stage

Relegation playoffs

Quarter-finals

Semi-finals

Final

Championship statistics

Top scorers

In a single game

Miscellaneous

 The relegation play-off between De La Salle and Ballysaggart was called off at the last minute because of a floodlight failure at Fraher Field.
 Roanmore qualified for the final for the first time since 1990.

References

Waterford Senior Hurling Championship
Waterford
Waterford Senior Hurling Championship